Glenostictia is a genus of sand wasps in the family Crabronidae. There are more than 20 described species in Glenostictia.

Species
These 21 species belong to the genus Glenostictia:

 Glenostictia angulata Gillaspy, 1985
 Glenostictia angulifera R. Bohart, 1985
 Glenostictia argentata (C. Fox, 1923)
 Glenostictia arizonae R. Bohart, 1983
 Glenostictia bifurcata (C. Fox, 1923)
 Glenostictia bituberculata (J. Parker, 1917)
 Glenostictia californica R. Bohart, 1983
 Glenostictia clypeata (Gillaspy, 1959)
 Glenostictia gilva Gillaspy, 1963
 Glenostictia megacera (J. Parker, 1917)
 Glenostictia mexicana R. Bohart, 1983
 Glenostictia nigriloba R. Bohart, 1983
 Glenostictia parva R. Bohart, 1983
 Glenostictia pictifrons (F. Smith, 1856)
 Glenostictia pulla (Handlirsch, 1890)
 Glenostictia satan Gillaspy, 1983
 Glenostictia scitula (W. Fox, 1895)
 Glenostictia tenuicornis (W. Fox, 1895)
 Glenostictia terlinguae (C. Fox, 1928)
 Glenostictia vechti R. Bohart, 1983
 Glenostictia veracruzae R. Bohart, 1983

References

Crabronidae
Articles created by Qbugbot